Ioannis Kefalogiannis (Greek: Ιωάννης Κεφαλογιάννης; born on June 18, 1982, in Rethymno, Crete) is a Greek New Democracy (ND) politician and lawyer.

Political career 
In the 2012 national elections, Ioannis Kefalogiannis was elected as the MP for the constituency of Rethymnon for the first time. He is the youngest Member of the New Democracy Party in this parliamentary composition. Furthermore, during the process of election at the Bureau of the Parliament, he was appointed Secretary to 226 votes, while he also serves as a member of the Standing Committee on Foreign Affairs and Defence of the House.

He is currently a member of the following committees: Standing Committee on National Defense and Foreign Affairs, Standing Committee on Economic Affairs, Committee on Armament Programs and Contracts, Commission permanente spécialisée de la protection de l’environnement.

Education 
He studied law at the Law School of Athens and continued with postgraduate studies in politics and international relations at Columbia University in New York. He was a fellow of the Institute John Nichoplas, scholarship awarded to the Greek with the best performance at the University of Columbia.

After completing the first cycle of postgraduate studies, he studied in the Legal Studies department, specializing in the art of negotiation for lawyers, at Harvard University.

References

External links 
 iCultural Diplomacy
 Ioannis Kefalogiannis Official
 Official Parliament Member Website

1982 births
Living people
21st-century Greek lawyers
Greek MPs 2012–2014
Greek MPs 2015 (February–August)
Greek MPs 2015–2019
Greek MPs 2019–2023
Harvard University alumni
New Democracy (Greece) politicians
School of International and Public Affairs, Columbia University alumni
People from Rethymno